Hoffman is a town in Richmond County, North Carolina, United States. The population was 588 at the 2010 census. It was named for a family of settlers.

Geography

Demographics

As of the census of 2000, there were 624 people, 219 households, and 167 families residing in the town. The population density was 181.6 people per square mile (70.0/km2). There were 238 housing units at an average density of 69.3 per square mile (26.7/km2). The racial makeup of the town was 41.19% White, 53.21% African American, 4.17% Native American, and 1.44% from two or more races. Hispanic or Latino of any race were 1.12% of the population.

There were 219 households, out of which 41.6% had children under the age of 18 living with them, 47.0% were married couples living together, 21.5% had a female householder with no husband present, and 23.7% were non-families. 18.7% of all households were made up of individuals, and 7.3% had someone living alone who was 65 years of age or older. The average household size was 2.82 and the average family size was 3.14.

In the town, the population was spread out, with 33.0% under the age of 18, 7.4% from 18 to 24, 32.9% from 25 to 44, 17.8% from 45 to 64, and 9.0% who were 65 years of age or older. The median age was 31 years. For every 100 females, there were 101.3 males. For every 100 females age 18 and over, there were 94.4 males.

The median income for a household in the town was $32,279, and the median income for a family was $34,688. Males had a median income of $25,893 versus $16,838 for females. The per capita income for the town was $14,726. About 17.2% of families and 24.5% of the population were below the poverty line, including 34.3% of those under age 18 and 16.7% of those age 65 or over.

References

Towns in Richmond County, North Carolina
Towns in North Carolina